Timur Irfanovich Sadredinov (born 10 May 1989 in Moscow) is a Russian auto racing driver.

Career
In 2007 he became the youngest ever driver to compete in the FIA World Touring Car Championship. He competed in two rounds at Oschersleben for GR Asia in a SEAT León, after impressing in the German SEAT Leon Supercopa. An encouraging debut saw him finish thirteenth in race one, and nineteenth in the second race. For the next event at Brands Hatch, Sadredinov was also due to race. Problems with his passport for getting into the United Kingdom meant he was replaced by fellow Russian driver Sergey Krylov.

Complete WTCC results
(key) (Races in bold indicate pole position) (Races in italics indicate fastest lap)

References

External links
 

Russian racing drivers
1989 births
Living people
Sportspeople from Moscow
European Touring Car Cup drivers
World Touring Car Championship drivers